Distributed intelligence may refer to:
 Group mind (science fiction)
 Collective intelligence, superorganism
 Distributed artificial intelligence, innovation system